Okruzhnaya ( - Circle [station]) is a station on the Moscow Central Circle of the Moscow Metro. The station named after the Moscow Circular Railway, the old name of nowaday Moscow Central Circle.

External links 
 mkzd.ru

Moscow Metro stations
Railway stations in Russia opened in 2016
Moscow Central Circle stations